Peter Meirs is the Vice President of Production Technologies for Time Inc. and an affiliate of the MIT Media Lab.

He currently oversees digital magazines, emerging media technologies, the Time Inc. digital archive group (E-MaG), the Digital Development Group, the OMS Print group, Time Inc. paper and production information systems (TimeXchange) and production systems development. Peter is also a founding member of the PRISM XML standard working group and has responsibility for Time Inc.'s efforts with electronic insertion orders and the AdsML advertising specification. Peter Meirs has left time inc. and is currently running his own company DigitalFirstMediaNY.
As a founding member of the IDEAlliance metadata Working Group, Peter helped develop PRISM, the industry's first magazine-based XML metadata standard. He currently serves as Chairman of the IDEAlliance nextPub/PRISM Source Vocabulary (PSV) Working Group, and was a 2012 recipient of the IDEAlliance Luminaire award.

Since joining Time Inc. in 1992, he has overseen its digital advertising and transmission systems, directed TIME magazine Editorial Operations and managed Time Inc.'s conversion to a fully digital production workflow. Peter is a frequent speaker at industry events on the subject of digital publishing technologies.

References
 NXT Book
 Pub Exec.com
 Magazine.ord
 Media Week.com
 Publish.com
 Circman
 Fipp.com
http://www.digitalfirstmediany.com/Our_Team.html

Living people
Magazine publishers (people)
Year of birth missing (living people)